Carl Isak Emanuel Pettersson (born 6 June 1997) is a Swedish professional footballer who plays as a goalkeeper for Norwegian club Stabæk.

Club career
Pettersson was signed to Halmstads BK from 2016 to 2018, after playing in their U17, U18 and U19 youth leagues. He went on loan to Östers IF for three months in 2016. In 2018, he signed to IFK Norrköping as a free transfer until 31 December 2020.

In 2018, Pettersson won "Goalkeeper of the Year" at the annual Allsvenskans Stora Pris which nominates the best Swedish footballers in the country. He won "Goalkeeper of the Year" again in 2019 for his second consecutive year.

On 5 January 2021, Pettersson signed a contract with Ligue 2 club Toulouse.

On 31 January 2023, Pettersson joined Stabæk in Norway until the end of 2023.

International career
Pettersson made his debut for the Sweden national team on 11 January 2019 in a friendly against Iceland, as a half-time substitute for Oscar Linnér.

Career statistics

References

External links
 
 
 
 
 

1997 births
Sportspeople from Halmstad
Sportspeople from Halland County
Living people
Swedish footballers
Association football goalkeepers
Sweden youth international footballers
Sweden international footballers
Halmstads BK players
Östers IF players
IFK Norrköping players
Toulouse FC players
Stabæk Fotball players
Allsvenskan players
Superettan players
Ligue 2 players
Championnat National 3 players
Swedish expatriate footballers
Expatriate footballers in France
Swedish expatriate sportspeople in France
Expatriate footballers in Norway
Swedish expatriate sportspeople in Norway